The Primrose League was an organisation for spreading Conservative principles in Great Britain. It was founded in 1883.

At a late point in its existence, its declared aims (published in the Primrose League Gazette, vol. 83, no. 2, March/April 1979) were:

 To Uphold and support God, Queen, and Country, and the Conservative cause;
 To provide an effective voice to represent the interests of our members and to bring the experience of the Leaders to bear on the conduct of public affairs for the common good;
 To encourage and help our members to improve their professional competence as leaders;
 To fight for free enterprise.

Foundation
The primrose was known as the "favourite flower" of Benjamin Disraeli, and so became associated with him.  Queen Victoria sent a wreath of primroses to his funeral on 26 April 1881 with the handwritten message: "His favourite flowers: from Osborne: a tribute of affectionate regard from Queen Victoria". On the day of the unveiling of Disraeli's statue all Conservative members of the House of Commons were decorated with the primrose.

A small group had for some time discussed the means for obtaining the support of the people for Conservative principles. Sir Henry Drummond Wolff said to Lord Randolph Churchill, "Let us found a primrose league". A meeting was held at the Carlton Club shortly afterwards, consisting of Churchill, Wolff, Sir John Gorst, Percy Mitford, Colonel Fred Burnaby and some others, to whom were subsequently added Satchell Hopkins, J. B. Stone, Rowlands and some Birmingham supporters of Burnaby, who also wished to return Lord Randolph Churchill as a Conservative member for that city. These founding members assisted in remodelling the original statutes, first drawn up by Wolff. Wolff had for some years perceived the influence exercised in benefit societies by badges and titular appellations, and he endeavoured to devise some quaint phraseology that would be attractive to the working classes. The title of "Knight Harbinger" was taken from an office no longer existing in the Royal Household, and a regular gradation was instituted for the honorific titles and decorations assigned to members. This idea, though at first ridiculed, was greatly developed since the foundation of the order; and new distinctions and decorations were founded, also contributing to the attractions of the league.

 
The motto was Imperium et libertas; the seal, three primroses; and the badge, a monogram containing the letters PL, surrounded by primroses. Many other badges and various articles of jewellery were designed later, with this flower as an emblem.

A small office was first taken on a second floor in Essex Street, The Strand, but this had soon to be abandoned, as the dimensions of the League rapidly increased. The league had two types of members who paid different annual subscriptions: full members (knights and dames) who were usually charged half a crown, and associate members who paid a few pence.

Ladies were generally included in the first organisation of the League, but subsequently a separate Ladies Branch and Grand Council were formed. The founder of the Ladies Grand Council was Lady Borthwick (afterwards Lady Glenesk), and the first meeting of the committee took place at her house in Piccadilly in March 1885. "The Primrose League was the first political organisation to give women the same status and responsibilities as men". The ladies who formed the first committee were: Lady Borthwick; the Dowager Duchess of Marlborough (first lady president); Lady Wimborne; Lady Randolph Churchill; Lady Charles Beresford; the Dowager Marchioness of Waterford; Julia, Marchioness of Tweeddale; Julia, Countess of Jersey; Mrs (subsequently Lady) Hardman; Lady Dorothy Nevill; the Honorable Lady Campbell (later Lady Blythswood); the Honorable Mrs Armitage; Mrs Bischoffsheim; Miss Meresia Nevill (the first secretary of the Ladies Council).

When the league had become a success, it was joined by Lord Salisbury and Sir Stafford Northcote, who were elected Grand Masters. Between its inauguration and 1910, its numbers gradually increased, as may be seen by the above table.

Sir Winston Churchill, in his book on his father, Lord Randolph Churchill published in 1906, stated that the Primrose League had one million paid up members "determined to promote the cause of Toryism".

Membership of the League was said to be "well over a million by the early 1890s", and at that time enjoyed more support than the British trade union movement. 6,000 people were members of the League in Bolton in 1900, which was as large as the national membership of the Independent Labour Party during the same time. However, by 1912 the League's membership had fallen to just over 650,000 as other leagues emerged, such as the Tariff Reform League and the Budget Protest League.

With the granting of universal suffrage after the First World War, the Conservative Party leadership decided that "A mass membership now seemed a necessary object if the Conservatives were to be on an equal footing with the mass battalions of the trade unions", and so with the scaling up of party membership, the need for ancillary support from organisations such as the Primrose League diminished, particularly as a conduit of female support who had now gained the vote and could be full members of the Conservative Party.

Activities
Members were expected to actively support the league, and to keep up interest, a programme of social events was organised for the membership, "of which the Primrose summer fête, often held in the grounds of stately homes opened for the first time for this purpose, provided the grand annual climax". There were, however, also day excursions and winter evening entertainments for league members, leading Flora Thompson to conclude that "It was no wonder the pretty little enamelled primrose badge, worn as a brooch or lapel ornament, was so much in evidence". At the events, the members would often be addressed by, and have the opportunity to meet members of the Parliamentary Conservative Party.

Part of the attraction of the League was due to its cross-class appeal: workers could enjoy the fêtes; the middle-classes could enjoy meeting the local nobs; while for upper-class women, the League offered an opportunity for political mobilisation, with the new bicycles providing means for them to reach a wide range of country villages.

Twentieth-century decline

By the early 20th century, the League had lost some of its early impetus, but prior to World War II, the League was still able to pack the Royal Albert Hall for its annual Grand Habitation. It continued its activities after the war, and celebrated its centenary in 1983 with its usual round of social and political events.

The League's Gazette carried articles by leading politicians of the day, including even then-leader and future Prime Minister Margaret Thatcher (in September/October 1977), but following the resignation of its industrious secretary of 45 years, Evelyn Hawley, C.B.E., at the end of 1988, it went into terminal decline.

Disbandment
The Daily Telegraph reported on 16 December 2004: 
"[T]his week saw a significant event for any observers of political history: after 121 years, the Primrose League was finally wound up. The league's aim was to promote Toryism across the country. 'In recent years, our meetings have become smaller and smaller,' says Lord Mowbray, one of the league's leading lights. Its remaining funds have been donated to Tory coffers. 'On Monday, I presented Michael Howard and Liam Fox with a cheque for £70,000,' adds Lord Mowbray proudly."

Administration

Grand Masters: 
Lord Salisbury

Sir Stafford Northcote

Stanley Baldwin [1st Earl Baldwin] (1924–1938)

Sir Kingsley Wood (1938–1943)

Sir Winston Churchill (1944–1965)

Alec Douglas-Home Lord Home of the Hirsel, KT, (1966Dec 1983)

Chancellors: 
The Lord Mowbray and Stourton (April 1975April 1979), (April 1981April 1984)

The Lord O'Hagan, MEP, (April 1979April 1981)

The Lord Murton of Lindisfarne, OBE, TD, JP, (April 1984Dec 1988)

Sir John Langford-Holt, (1989present)

Hon. Treasurer: 
Sir Graham Rowlandson, MBE, JP (1977June 1985)

Mr. W.L.Grant (June 1985August 1988)

Peter Bowring (Sept 1988present)

 President, Ladies Grand Council

Mrs Lucy Baldwin (1935)

Chairman, Churchill Chapter
Geoffrey Johnson-Smith, MP (1977present)

Chairman, Ladies' Churchill Chapter: 
Mrs Evelyn King (in 1977June 1986)

Judith, Lady Roberts (June 1985present)

Chairman, General Purposes Committee: 
John Heydon Stokes, MP (1971June 1985)

William Cash, MP (June 1985July 1988)

Richard W.L. Smith (July 1988present)

Chairman, Political Committee: 
Richard W.L. Smith (from April 1987present)

Secretary:
James McAuslane, Esquire (?-1911-?)

Mrs Evelyn M. Hawley, CBE, OBE (1943–1988)

Hon. Director:
Roger Boaden, MBE, (27 Sept 1988present)

Trustees: 
Col. Sir Leonard Ropner, Bt, MC,(1977)

The Lord St. Helens, MC., (1977Dec 1980)

The Lord Tweedsmuir, CBE

Robert Cooke, MP (1977June 1987)

The Lord Mowbray and Stourton, CBE, (March 1980present)

The Lord Denham, PC, (April 1988present)

See also
 Primrose Day
 Primrose Club

Notes

References

Further reading

 The Primrose League Gazette (originally bi-monthly, later quarterly). Quality paper, sized in between A4 and A5, some photos. (1989 editions in tabloid newspaper form). Editors: Mr Greenland (retired Dec 1976), William Cash, MP (1977Dec 1979), John Stokes (Jan/Feb, March, & April 1980 editions), Stephen Parker (May 19801989 incl).

Political parties established in 1883
Political parties disestablished in 2004
Political history of the United Kingdom
Organisations associated with the Conservative Party (UK)
1883 establishments in the United Kingdom
2004 disestablishments in the United Kingdom